Havi may refer to:
Hávi, a variant form of Hár, one of the names of Odin, the chief god in Norse mythology
HAVi, the Home Audio Video Interoperability standard